China Agricultural University (CAU, ; abbreviated as 农大) is a public research university in Beijing, People's Republic of China specializing in  agriculture, biology, engineering, veterinary medicine, economics, management, humanities and social science. It was formed in 1995 through the merger of the Beijing Agricultural University and the Beijing Agricultural Engineering University, which evolved from one of the earliest agriculture institutions in China founded in 1905 (京师大学堂).

As of December 2019, CAU offers 66 undergraduate majors and over 32 masters and 21 doctoral programs. There are around 12,000 undergraduate and 8,900 graduate students. Among them, 508 students are international. Its gymnasium hosted the wrestling events during the 2008 Summer Olympics. 

CAU is a Chinese Ministry of Education Class A Double First Class University, and is designated as part of both Project 985, to create world class universities in China, and Project 211, to raise the research standards of universities.

The China Agricultural University is widely regarded as one of the world's top agricultural research institutions. As of 2021, the "Agricultural Science" program is ranked 2nd worldwide by the Shanghai Ranking and the U.S. News Rankings.

History
The history of China Agricultural University can be traced back to 1905 when the College of Agriculture was founded in the former Imperial University of Peking. Beijing Agricultural University (BAU) was established in September 1949 through the merging of Peking University's College of Agriculture, Tsinghua University's College of Agriculture and North China University's College of Agriculture.  

In 1954, BAU was listed by the State Council as one of the Top-Six National Key Universities as well as one of the Top-Ten Key Universities for further construction and improvement. 

In October 1952, BAU's Department of Agricultural Machinery, North China College of Agricultural Machinery and Ministry of Agriculture's Central Agricultural Mechanization School merged to form the Beijing Mechanized Agricultural College, which was renamed Beijing Agricultural Mechanization Institute (BAMI) in July 1953. The BAMI was listed by the State Council in October 1960 as one of the 64 National Key Universities and then renamed again as Beijing Agricultural Engineering University (BAEU) in 1985. 

In 1995, Beijing Agricultural University and Beijing Agricultural Engineering University merged as China Agricultural University (CAU). Since then, the university has become the top academic institution in China in terms of agricultural studies.

Faculties and Colleges

College of Agronomy
College of Horticulture
College of Plant Protection
College of Biological Sciences
College of Animal Science and Technology
College of Veterinary Medicine
College of Food Science and Nutritional Engineering
College of Resources and Environmental Sciences
College of Information and Electrical Engineering
College of Engineering
College of Water Conservancy and Civil Engineering
College of Science
College of Economics and Management
College of Humanities and Development
International College at Beijing
School of Continuing Education
Department of Arts Education and Physical Education
Department of Ideological Education
Yantai Academy of China Agricultural University (Yantai Campus)
Beijing Construction University

China Agricultural University Library

China Agricultural University Library consists of two parts, east library (No.17 Qinghua East Road) and west library (No.2 Yuanmingyuan West Road) occupying 21,665 square meters and hosting 2774 reading seats.
China Agricultural University Library (CAUL) is one of the most important libraries in agricultural education and research in China. The collections include both paper documents numbering more than 1.7 million volumes and over 1.47 million electronic documents. The collections emphasize agricultural science, biology and agricultural engineering.
116 library staff work in the library including 39 research librarians and associate research librarians. 29 library staff are post-graduates. CAUL also functions as National Agricultural Information Center of CALIS (China Academic Library and Information System) and National Foreign Textbook Center in Agriculture. Haidian District Agriculture Library is affiliated with the China Agricultural University Library.
CAUL established an automatic information service system in 1995. This now runs efficiently and successfully. 
User education is one of the main functions of CAUL. The library provides different kinds of training courses and workshops to students and faculty every year. CAUL has been actively developing international communication and cooperation. CAUL will pursue collection development, personalized information services and resources sharing.

China Agricultural University Gymnasium

The China Agricultural University Gymnasium (simplified Chinese: 中国农业大学体育馆; traditional Chinese: 中國農業大學體育館; pinyin: Zhōngguó Nóngyè Dàxué Tǐyùguǎn) is an indoor arena located on the campus of the China Agricultural University in Beijing. Construction started the first half of 2005 and was completed in July 2007. It hosted the wrestling events of the 2008 Summer Olympics. The Gymnasium's rooftop has a staggered, stair-like design.
It covers an area of 23,950 square metres and has a capacity of 8,200 which will be reduced to 6000. It will also be turned into a sports complex for students of the China Agricultural University after the Olympic Games.

Rugby Union
China Agricultural University has played a key part in the reintroduction of rugby union into modern China and its subsequent growth.

Rugby re-emerged in the PRC in 1990, with a club formed at Beijing Agricultural University. A professor there, Chao Xihuang was introduced to the sport by a Japanese businessman, and set up a couple of sides.

Rankings and Reputation 
The China Agricultural University is listed as one of the top 300 universities in the World University Rankings. As of 2021, China Agricultural University is ranked the best university in the world in "Agricultural Sciences" by the Performance Ranking of Scientific Papers for World Universities. CAU ranked 2nd globally in both the Academic Ranking of World Universities (ARWU) and the U.S. News & World Report Best Global University Ranking for "Agricultural Sciences" and the QS World University Rankings listed CAU 5th in the world in "Agriculture & Forestry". It also ranks 2nd globally in "Food Science and Technology" and 16th in world in "Veterinary Sciences" by the Academic Ranking of World Universities.

Facts

Number of students and faculty members:
 Full-time undergraduates: 11,838
 Full-time master's degree students: 4,302
 Full-time doctoral degree students: 2,732
 Postdoctoral researchers: 207
 Academic staff: 1,581

Number of degree programs:
 Undergraduate degree programs: 64
 Master's degree programs: 171
 Doctoral degree programs: 95

Sports:
 Host of 2008 Beijing Olympics wrestling competitions
 Home of China's national female rugby team
 Home of China's national youth male rugby team
 Key members of the university's mountaineering team
 Hold membership in the national mountaineering team
 Responsible for conducting the Mount Everest portion of the 2008 Olympics torch relay.

References

External links
 CAU web site
 China Agricultural University Library (CAUL)
 CAU Office of International Relations
 Campus real three-dimensional map
 China agricultural university library(CAUL)web site

 
Universities and colleges in Beijing
Veterinary schools in China
Educational institutions established in 1905
Agricultural universities and colleges in China
1905 establishments in China
Vice-ministerial universities in China
Project 985
Project 211
Plan 111
Schools in Haidian District
Universities and colleges in Haidian District